The Smithsonian Folkways Collection is a career-spanning box set of recordings by American folk and blues singer Lead Belly. It was released in 2015 by Smithsonian Folkways.

Album
The box-set is a 5-CD collection featuring five hours of music, with 16 previously unreleased tracks, and a 140-page, large-format book. It covers a range of styles and themes including many topical songs about world events and cultural figures. Songs about fellow blues singer Blind Lemon Jefferson, a tribute to Hollywood actress Jean Harlow after her death and "Princess Elizabeth" about Elizabeth II, then a 21-year-old princess, in tribute to her wedding to Philip Mountbatten. Lead Belly documents the racial injustice of the Jim Crow South with the songs "Jim Crow Blues" and "The Bourgeois Blues". There are songs on the Scottsboro Boys, the Hindenburg disaster and "Hitler Song (Mr Hitler)" about Adolf Hitler. The compilation also includes songs directed towards the Governor of Texas Pat Morris Neff and Governor of Louisiana Oscar K. Allen where he is asking for a pardon from prison.

The box-set is intended to be "a museum exhibit in a coffee-table set” in order to give context to the history of the music. The 140-page book contains multiple essays, dozens of photographs, many previously unpublished and reproductions of session sheets, letters, newspaper clips and concert fliers.

Critical reception

The Smithsonian Folkways Collection received unanimously positive reviews from critics. On the critical aggregator website Metacritic it has a score of 95 out of 100, based on reviews by eight critics, indicating "universal acclaim". 

Writing for The Guardian, Robin Denselow gave it five out of five stars, calling it, "remarkable for its power, freshness and range." The Daily Telegraph rated it five out of five stars, writing "The range of the songs on this, the first career-spanning box set dedicated to the American music icon, is incredible." Stephen M. Deusner, of Pitchfork, called the album "as fine a retrospective as you can find for Lead Belly, showcasing the diversity of his repertoire and the precision of his playing and singing."

Track listing

References

2015 compilation albums
Lead Belly albums
Smithsonian Folkways compilation albums